Châtillon station may refer to:

Stations in France 
 Châtillon-d'Azergues station, an SNCF station in Auvergne-Rhône-Alpes
 Châtillon-en-Michaille station, see 
 Châtillon-sur-Seine station, see Laignes
 Marlieux—Châtillon station, Marlieux, Ain department

Stations in Italy 
 Châtillon-Saint-Vincent railway station, a railway station in the Aosta Valley

See also
 Châtillon (disambiguation)